Anikó Kántor (born 26 March 1968 in Budapest) is a former Hungarian team handball player and Olympic medalist, who currently works as a handball coach. She received a bronze medal at the 1996 Summer Olympics in Atlanta, and also received a silver medal at the 2000 Summer Olympics in Sydney.

References

External links

1968 births
Living people
Handball players from Budapest
Hungarian female handball players
Olympic silver medalists for Hungary
Olympic bronze medalists for Hungary
Handball players at the 1996 Summer Olympics
Handball players at the 2000 Summer Olympics
Olympic medalists in handball
Medalists at the 2000 Summer Olympics
Medalists at the 1996 Summer Olympics
20th-century Hungarian women
21st-century Hungarian women